Traxxas is a radio control model manufacturer based in McKinney, Texas. Traxxas offers electric and nitro powered radio-controlled cars, off-road and on-road vehicles, boats, and drones.

Company history 
Starting in 1986, Traxxas began selling a series of electric powered stadium truck and buggy models. In 1989, Traxxas released its first radio-controlled boat, the Villan IV. In 1992, its first RTR nitro model, the Nitro Hawk, was released, followed by an RTR nitro boat, the Nitro Vee, four years later.

In 1999, Traxxas released its first full sized monster truck model, the T-Maxx. A larger monster truck; the X-Maxx, came out in 2015. Traxxas also debuted a self-righting system in which flipped vehicles can adjust itself back in place.

In November 2012, Traxxas launched its first aircraft products, the ready-to-fly DR-1 Helicopter and QR-1 Quadcopter.

Notable "Firsts" 

 FIRST Fuel Burning Ready-to-Run RC
 FIRST Ready-to-Run RC
 FIRST Driver-actuated Forward/Reverse Transmission
 FIRST Remote-operated Locking Differentials
 FIRST High/Low Transmission
 FIRST Auto-shifting 2-Speed Transmission
 FIRST Waterproof Electronics
 FIRST 2.4GHz Transmitter with Apple iOS interface
 FIRST 100mph RTR Vehicle
 FIRST Self-Righting Monster Trucks

Traxxas Racing 

 Traxxas was a title sponsor for the Stadium Super Trucks, which Traxxas president Mike Jenkins competed in during its inaugural season. During the 2016 season, Team Traxxas fielded trucks for Matthew Brabham and Sheldon Creed.
 Traxxas also sponsors athletes who compete in motocross. This includes Ryder DiFrancesco, Carson Mumford, Gage Schehr, Axell Hodges, and Justin Mulford.
 Traxxas was the lead sponsor for John Force Racing team member, Courtney Force, who is the daughter of John Force. Courtney Force drives the Traxxas Chevrolet Camaro SS Funny Car in the NHRA.
 Traxxas was a sponsor in the Championship Off-Road Racing (CORR) series until its demise in 2008. It took over as the title sponsor in an off-road racing series called the Traxxas TORC Series. Traxxas demonstrated its products at events and had a Traxxas Mobile Support Center on site. The Mobile Support Center carried Traxxas parts, cars, trucks, and boats. Traxxas' lead sponsorship of the TORC Series ended in 2014.
 Traxxas-sponsored drivers in short course racing are Jenkins, Keegan Kincaid, RJ Anderson, and Jeremy McGrath.
 In 2010, Traxxas sponsored the No. 18 Toyota Tundra of Kyle Busch in the NASCAR Camping World Truck Series.<ref>

In the early 2000's, Traxxas sponsored the Traxxas T-Maxx monster truck with veteran driver John Seasock driving. The truck competed in the then national 4 Wheel Jamboree Series among others.</re

References

External links 
 

Model manufacturers of the United States
Companies based in McKinney, Texas
American companies established in 1986
Privately held companies based in Texas
Manufacturing companies based in Texas
Radio-controlled car manufacturers